Andalusia is a village in Rock Island County, Illinois, United States. The population was 1,178 at the 2010 census, an increase from 1,050 in 2000.

Geography
Andalusia is located along the Mississippi River at  (41.440431, -90.720932).

Demographics

At the 2000 census there were 1,050 people, 402 households, and 307 families living in the village. The racial makeup of the village was 97.05% White, 0.57% African American, 0.10% Native American, 0.76% from other races, and 1.52% from two or more races. Hispanic or Latino of any race were 2.19%.

Of the 402 households 34.1% had children under the age of 18 living with them, 63.2% were married couples living together, 10.7% had a female householder with no husband present, and 23.4% were non-families. 18.9% of households were one person and 8.0% were one person aged 65 or older. The average household size was 2.61 and the average family size was 3.02.

The age distribution was 24.7% under the age of 18, 9.1% from 18 to 24, 29.5% from 25 to 44, 26.2% from 45 to 64, and 10.5% 65 or older. The median age was 39 years. For every 100 females, there were 93.7 males. For every 100 females age 18 and over, there were 91.1 males.

The median household income was $46,552 and the median family income  was $56,250. Males had a median income of $37,438 versus $25,179 for females. The per capita income for the village was $20,626. About 3.1% of families and 2.9% of the population were below the poverty line, including 2.8% of those under age 18 and 11.1% of those age 65 or over.

References

External links
Official Website
Rock Island County Historical Society

Villages in Rock Island County, Illinois
Illinois populated places on the Mississippi River
Villages in Illinois
Cities in the Quad Cities